The Revenge of the Fifth is the fifth studio album by Canadian skate punk band Belvedere, released April 30, 2016. It is their first full-length release since 2004's Fast Forward Eats the Tape. The album was recorded by Casey Lewis at Echo Base Studio in Calgary, Alberta, Canada. It was mixed by Andrew Berlin and mastered by Jason Livermore at the Blasting Room in Fort Collins, Colorado. It is the first album to feature Casey Lewis on drums, replacing Graham Churchill due to conflicting commitments outside the band.

Track listing

Personnel
 Steve Rawles - Vocals, Rhythm Guitar
 Scott Marshal - Lead Guitar
 Jason Sinclair - Bass
 Casey Lewis - Drums

References

External links 
 Album page on bandcamp.com
 Band page on bandcamp.com

2016 albums
Belvedere (band) albums